"Dancing in the Moonlight (It's Caught Me in Its Spotlight)" is a song by the Irish rock band Thin Lizzy. It appears on their 1977 album Bad Reputation and was also released as a single a few months before the album. The song reached No. 14 in the UK Singles Chart in September 1977. It should not be confused with a similarly named song, "Dancing in the Moonlight", recorded by King Harvest and Toploader, amongst others.

The song builds on the introductory bass riff played by Phil Lynott, adding the vocal melody line sung by Lynott which contrasts and synergizes with the saxophone melodic counterpoint played by Supertramp's John Helliwell.

Covers
The Smashing Pumpkins covered the song for various live performances, turning the originally upbeat, overlaid melody of the original into a slow paced acoustic tune; it was recorded as B-side of the single "Disarm". British indie pop singer-songwriter Diana Vickers covered the song as the first of several covers used as teasers leading up to the release of her second studio album.

In 2012 the English indie rock band Alt-J released a mash up of "Dancing in the Moonlight" for the compilation album, The Saturday Sessions from The Dermot O'Leary Show. Later it was recorded at Spotify Studios NYC and released as part of their Spotify Singles project in 2017.

In 2017 British singer Josh Dally released a reworked acoustic ballad version of the song.

In commercials
In 2005, this song was used as part of an advertising campaign to launch Magners Irish Cider in the UK.

In 2021, this song was used in an advertisement for Specsavers hearing aids in the UK.

References

1977 songs
1977 singles
Thin Lizzy songs
Songs written by Phil Lynott
Song recordings produced by Tony Visconti